NGC 4911 is a disturbed, warped spiral galaxy with a bright prominent central starburst ring and located deep within the Coma Cluster of galaxies, which lies some 300 million light years away in the northern constellation Coma Berenices. NGC 4911 is believed to be interacting with its warped, barred lenticular companion (or any of its many other nearby companions), producing the enhanced star formation and shell-like appearance seen in optical images. The galaxy contains rich lanes of dust and gas near its centre. The existence of clouds of hydrogen within the galaxy indicates ongoing star formation. It is rare for a spiral galaxy to be situated at the heart of a cluster.

References

External links
 

4911
Coma Cluster
Coma Berenices
Intermediate spiral galaxies
044840